Astra Stadium is a football-only stadium in Ploiești, Romania. It is currently used as the home ground of FC Astra II, the reserves team of Astra Giurgiu, former Astra Ploiești, club that moved in 2012 from Ploiești to Giurgiu.

Association football

See also
List of football stadiums in Romania

External links
Soccerway profile. soccerway.com 

Football venues in Romania
Buildings and structures in Prahova County
Sport in Ploiești
FC Astra Giurgiu